Phenomenal Handclap Band is the first full-length album from Phenomenal Handclap Band. It contains their hit "15 To 20." It features guest musicians from bands such as TV on the Radio, the Dap-Kings, Jon Spencer, and Lady Tigra. It was followed up by a remix album call Remixes

Track listing
"The Journey to Serra Da Estrela" (Collás) – 6:05
"All of the Above" (Collás) – 5:37
"Testimony" (Marquand, Collás, & Valle) – 5:01
"Give It a Rest" (Marquand, Collás, & O'Malley) – 4:36
"You'll Disappear" (Collás) – 6:29
"15 To 20"  (Collás & Marquand) – 4:49
"Dim the Lights" (Marquand & Phalen) – 6:08
"I Been Born Again" (Kaylan & Volman) – 4:52
"The Martyr" (Collás) – 5:44
"Tears" (Marquand) – 3:46
"Baby" (Collás) – 4:12
"The Circle Is Broken" (Collás) – 8:59

References

 Thompson, P. (2009, August 13). Pitchfork. Phenomenal Handclap Band. Retrieved November 10, 2011 from http://pitchfork.com/reviews/albums/13376-the-phenomenal-handclap-band/
 The Phenomenal Handclap Band (2011) . Retrieved November 10, 2011, from http://www.friendlyfirerecordings.com/Bands/PHCB/phcb.html
 The Phenomenal Handclap Band - MP3, Disco D'or tonight (2008). Retrieved November 10, 2011, from http://www.brooklynvegan.com/archives/2008/09/the_phenomenal.html
 THE PHENOMENAL HANDCLAP BAND RELEASES (2010). Retrieved November 10, 2011, from http://www.gomma.de/gommareleases/handclapreleases/
 The Phenomenal Handclap Band (2011). Retrieved November 10, 2011, from http://www.last.fm/music/The+Phenomenal+Handclap+Band
 Landry. (2009, October 6). Luxury Wafers. Luxury Wafers Exclusive: The Phenomenal Handclap Band, Live@Chessvolt Studios with Video and mp3. Retrieved November 10, 2011 from http://luxurywafers.net/2009/10/luxury-wafers-exclusive-the-phenomenal-handclap-band-livechessvolt-studios-with-video-and-mp3/
 Power, C. (2009, June 29). BBC. BBC Review. Retrieved November 10, 2011 from https://www.bbc.co.uk/music/reviews/v363
 Phenomenal Handclap Band Discography (2011). Retrieved November 11, 2011, from http://www.discogs.com/artist/Phenomenal+Handclap+Band,+The

2009 debut albums